Schriebers Meadow Cone is a small parasitic cone on the southeastern flank of Mount Baker in the U.S. state of Washington. It was formed about 9,800 years ago by the only known Holocene flank eruption of Mount Baker. A basaltic lava flow traveled down the Sulphur Creek valley and across the Baker River valley; this is the most recent lava flow at Mount Baker. Future eruptions from Schriebers Meadow Cone are unlikely to occur as it is considered a short-lived feature.

Schriebers Meadow Cone produced thick dark-reddish-brown to yellowish-red scoria that blankets the sides of the Sulphur Creek valley near and southeast of Schriebers Meadow. Near Schriebers Meadow the scoria deposit is thickest on the north valley wall and it decreases in grain size and thickness within short distances.

References

Mount Baker
Parasitic cones
Cascade Volcanoes
Volcanoes of Washington (state)
Cinder cones of the United States
Holocene volcanoes